Chloroflexales is an order of bacteria in the class Chloroflexia. The clade is also known as filamentous anoxygenic phototrophic bacteria (FAP), as the order contains phototrophs that do not produce oxygen. These bacteria are facultative aerobic. They generally use chemotrophy when oxygen is present and switch to light-derived energy when otherwise. Most species are heterotrophs, but a few are capable of photoautotrophy.

The order can be divided into two suborders. Chloroflexineae ("Green FAP", "green non-sulfur bacteria") is the better-known one. This suborder uses chlorosomes, a specialized antenna complex, to pass light energy to the reaction center. Roseiflexineae ("Red FAP") on the other hand has no such ability. The named colors are not absolute, as growth conditions such as oxygen concentration will make a green FAP appear green, brown, or reddish-orange by inducing changes in pigment composition.

Taxonomy
The currently accepted taxonomy is based on the List of Prokaryotic names with Standing in Nomenclature (LPSN) and National Center for Biotechnology Information (NCBI).

 Suborder Roseiflexineae Gupta et al. 2013
 Family Roseiflexaceae Gupta et al. 2013 ["Kouleotrichaceae" Mehrshad et al. 2018]
 Genus "Kouleothrix" Kohno et al. 2002
 Genus Heliothrix Pierson et al. 1986
 Genus Roseiflexus Hanada et al. 2002
 Suborder Chloroflexineae Gupta et al. 2013
 Family Chloroflexaceae Gupta et al. 2013
 Genus Candidatus Chloranaerofilum Thiel et al. 2016
 Genus Chloroflexus Pierson & Castenholz 1974 ["Chlorocrinis"]
 Family Oscillochloridaceae Gupta et al. 2013
 Genus Candidatus Chloroploca Gorlenko et al. 2014
 Genus Chloronema ♪ Dubinina & Gorlenko 1975
 Genus Oscillochloris Gorlenko & Pivovarova 1989
 Genus Candidatus Viridilinea Grouzdev et al. 2018

Phylogeny

See also
 List of bacterial orders

References

External links

Phototrophic bacteria
Chloroflexota